The Girl in the Web is a 1920 American silent mystery film directed by Robert Thornby and starring Blanche Sweet, Nigel Barrie, and Adele Farrington.

Cast
 Blanche Sweet as Esther Maitland 
 Nigel Barrie as Dick Ferguson 
 Thomas Jefferson as Samuel Van Zile Janney 
 Adele Farrington as Mrs. Janney 
 Hayward Mack as Chapman Price 
 Christine Mayo as Mrs. Price 
 Peaches Jackson as Bebita

References

Bibliography
 Monaco, James. The Encyclopedia of Film. Perigee Books, 1991.

External links

1920 films
1920 mystery films
American mystery films
Films directed by Robert Thornby
American silent feature films
American black-and-white films
Pathé Exchange films
1920s English-language films
1920s American films
Silent mystery films
Films based on American novels